Nuphar advena (spatterdock or cow lily or yellow pond-lily) is a species of Nuphar native throughout the eastern United States and in some parts of Canada, such as Nova Scotia. It is similar to the Eurasian species N. lutea, and is treated as a subspecies of it by some botanists, though differing significantly in genetics.

It is locally naturalized in Britain.

Uses 
Spatterdock was long used in traditional medicine, with the root applied to the skin and/or both the root and seeds eaten for a variety of conditions. The seeds are edible, and can be ground into flour. The root is edible too, but can prove to be incredibly bitter in some plants.

References

External links 
Yellow Pond Lily

Nymphaeaceae
Aquatic plants
Edible plants
Medicinal plants
Flora of North America